Tomás Henríquez (1921–2002) was a Venezuelan film and television actor.

Selected filmography 
 The Yacht Isabel Arrived This Afternoon (1949)
 Dawn of Life (1950)
 Green Territory (1952)
 Simón Bolívar (1969)

References

Bibliography 
 Rist, Peter H. Historical Dictionary of South American Cinema. Rowman & Littlefield, 2014.

External links 
 

1921 births
2002 deaths
Venezuelan male film actors
Venezuelan male television actors
People from Caracas